The Fairfield Stags men's lacrosse team represents Fairfield University in Fairfield, Connecticut and competes in the Colonial Athletic Association of NCAA Division I. The Stags have won eight regular season conference titles since 1996 and competed in the NCAA Division I men's lacrosse tournament in 2002 and 2005.  The Stags play their home games at the new lacrosse-only  Rafferty Stadium.

History

As a Jesuit university, Fairfield shares a unique historical connection to the discovery of modern-day lacrosse. Jesuit missionaries first witnessed the game of "baggataway" being played amongst Native Americans during the 17th century. According to histories of the game, it was Saint John de Brebeuf S.J., a French Jesuit missionary in Canada, who named the present-day version of the Indian game lacrosse because the stick used reminded him of a bishop's crosier, pronounced la crosse in French. Saint John de Brebeuf, S.J. is memorialized at Fairfield University with the #1 de Brebeuf Townhouse Unit named in his honor.

Dawn of the Stags
The Fairfield Stags men's lacrosse program first began in 1973 as a club team. Future Fairfield University Athletic Hall of Famer Will Mraz was a founding member and the offensive leader of the inaugural club team. The first coach of the Fairfield University Lacrosse Club was Ken Gilstein, Cornell '70, who coached the team during the 1972, 1973, 1976 and 1977 seasons. It was led by standout players Bob Rupp, and John Hughes in the 70s and John Callegari, future Fairfield University Athletic Hall of Famer Hugh "Skeets" Coyle, Joe Sargent, Mike Hone, Kevin Kuryla and Rich MacDonough in the 80s, the club team established itself as amongst the best in New England. In 1987, the team had an undefeated 11-0 season and won the New England Club Championship.

Red Stags rising
Fairfield elevated the lacrosse program to NCAA Division I in 1993 with Tom McClelland at the helm. The Stags first victory as a varsity program came in its very first game with an 11-6 defeat of a visiting St. Joseph's team. In 1996, Ted Spencer took the helm and Fairfield became a founding member of an eight-team Metro Atlantic Athletic Conference (MAAC) lacrosse league. With Ted Spencer as coach, the team went undefeated in the first year of MAAC lacrosse league play followed by three consecutive league titles (1996, 1997 and 1998) and two ECAC tournament championships (1998 and 1999).  In 2000, Fairfield became an independent program. In 2001, the university program joined the Great Western Lacrosse League (GWLL) paving the way for a new era in Stags lacrosse. Ted Spencer guided the Stags to great success on the national stage including two NCAA Tournament appearances (2002 and 2005), two Great Western Lacrosse League Championships (2002 and 2005), and developed 2 All-Americans (C. J. Kemp and Greg Downing) along with 21 All-New England selections and 8 Academic All-New England selections.

NCAA Tournament time

In 2002, the Stags finished in first place in the GWLL and received the league's automatic bid to the 2002 NCAA tournament. Making the program's first postseason visit, the Stags fell to UMass in the first round. At the conclusion of the season, the Stags were selected as the winner of the Joseph (Frenchy) Julien Memorial Award for Sportsmanship.

The 2005 season will go down as one of the greatest in Fairfield history with the Stags' finishing as the 15th ranked team in the nation.  Not one for dramatics, the Stags won the Great Western Lacrosse League and earned a trip to the 2005 NCAA Tournament with a dramatic victory over then 12th ranked Denver in the last game of the season.  In the 1st round of the 2005 NCAA Tournament, the Stags fell to eventual 2005 National Finalist, Duke.

The Stags first official season as a member of the ECAC Lacrosse League in 2006 proved a successful one with Stags posting a winning league record.  Major victories included wins over Harvard and then 16th ranked Loyola.  The victory over Loyola marked the program's first win over the Greyhounds and included the now infamous hidden ball goal.

Copelan era
Andrew Copelan became the third head coach in the history of the program on August 25, 2008.  On April 21, 2013, men's lacrosse set the school record for the defeat of the highest ranked opponent when the Stags upset the then no. 1 nationally ranked Denver Pioneers 9-8.  The previous record was set on March 13, 2010, when the Stags upset the then no. 3 nationally ranked (and eventual 2010 NCAA tournament runner-up) Notre Dame Fighting Irish 10–8 while competing in the inaugural 'Beating Cancer With A Stick Classic' at The Kinkaid School in Houston, Texas.  During the 2015 season, the Stags achieved a number of firsts in dedicating the program's new state-of-the-art lacrosse only Rafferty Stadium and winning the Regular Season Title during its inaugural season in the Colonial Athletic Association.

All-time head coaches

Annual records

 (1)Laxpower Power Rating
 (2) Lost CAA Finals 4-2 to Towson.
 (3) Lost NCAA 1st round 23-4 to Duke.
 (4) Lost NCAA 1st round 14-7 to Massachusetts.

Awards

All-Time statistic leaders

Stags in the MLL

Twelve Stags have been drafted by Major League Lacrosse and one by the National Lacrosse League.  Peter Vlahakis is the leading face-off man in MLL history holding four MLL All-Time face-off records and was selected to the 2007 and 2008 MLL All-Star Game.  Greg Downing was the sixth overall pick in the 2007 MLL Collegiate Draft and was selected to the 2008 MLL All-Star Game.  The following Stag players were selected in the Major League Lacrosse draft:

See also
NCAA Men's Lacrosse Championship (1971–  )
Wingate Memorial Trophy (1934–1970)

References

External links
 

 
1973 establishments in Connecticut
Lacrosse clubs established in 1973
College men's lacrosse teams in the United States